is a Japanese freestyle wrestler who competes at 65 kilograms. At the 2020 Summer Olympics, Otoguro claimed the gold medal after beating the likes of defending World Champion Gadzhimurad Rashidov and three-time World Champion Haji Aliyev. A Cadet World Champion, Otoguro first broke into the senior scene when he went undefeated (16–0) in 2018, claiming the World Championship and the National Championship at age 19. He then went on to become a two–time Asian Continental Champion (claiming titles in 2020 and 2021).

Career

Early career 
Otoguro begun wrestling at a young age. During his junior high school years, he studied and trained at the Elite Academy, which is hosted by the Japanese Olympic Committee. His first international appearance came at the 2013 Cadet World Championships, where he claimed a bronze medal. After earning the 2014 Cadet Asian Championship, Otoguro was unable to medal at the 2014 Cadet World Championship, placing eleventh. In 2015, Otoguro became a Cadet World Champion.

Senior level

2018 
Otoguro made his senior freestyle debut in April 2018, at the World Cup, where he posted wins over 2016 World Champion and four–time NCAA champion Logan Stieber and India's 2017 Junior Asian Champion Sharvan. Otoguro then comfortably claimed the All–Japan Invitational crown with a flawless 6–0 win in the finals against 2016 Olympic Silver medalist Rei Higuchi, qualifying him for the JPN World Team Trials. At the WTT, he faced '2018 Asian Championship runner–up Daichi Takatani, whom he was able to flawlessly drive to a technical fall in under two minutes to claim the spot.

At the World Championships, Otaguro made his way to the semifinals with three technical falls, including one over the accomplished veteran Vasyl Shuptar. In the semis, he had a 25–point score match against Russian National champion Akhmed Chakaev, whom he was able to edge 15–10 to make the finals. In the finals, he had another 25–point score match, now against 2018 Asian Games Gold medalist Bajrang Punia, whom he defeated 16–9 to claim the World Championship at 65 kilograms. In doing so, Otaguro became the youngest Japanese wrestler to ever win a world title at the age of 19. He then wasted no time and became Japan's National Champion with wins over the accomplished Rei Higuchi and '18 Asian Games Silver medalist Daichi Takatani (by technical fall), being named the Outstanding Wrestler. After his championship performance through 2018, Otaguro was named one of the Breakout Performers of the Year and his match with Punia was named the Match of the Year by United World Wrestling.

2019 
Otoguro was not able to compete at the Asian Championships nor the World Cup due to a knee injury and was able to practice again a month before the All-Japan Invitational Championships. At the tournament, limited preparation seemed to affect Otoguro, who lost by technical fall to Rei Higuchi in his first career loss as a senior. As the '18 Japan National champion, Otoguro rematched Higuchi at the WTT, and was able to defeat him to earn the spot.

At the World Championships, the returning champion got through the first round with a comfortable 6–0 score, but was then soundly defeated by two–time World Championship runner-up and eventual winner of the championship Gadzhimurad Rashidov with a score of 1–8. As the Russian kept advancing, Otoguro was able to go through repechage, where he had a 20–point score battle against three–time World and European Champion Haji Aliyev, whom he edged 11–9, and a 6–1 victory over Haji Mohamad Ali to make it to the third-place match. In the bronze-medal match, he was defeated by 2018 Russian National runner–up Ismail Musukaev to place fifth. Otoguro then became a two–time Japan National Champion and Olympian on December, with a victory over 2017 U23 World champion Rinya Nakamura in the finals.

2020 
Otoguro came back in big fashion on February, when he claimed the Asian Continental Championship while posting notable and dominant victories over 2019 World Championship runner-up and three–time Asian Champion Daulet Niyazbekov (10–3) and the accomplished veteran Bajrang Punia in a rematch (10–2).

Otoguro was scheduled to represent Japan at the 2020 Summer Olympics on August, however, the Olympic Games were postponed due to the COVID-19 pandemic, and are now expected to take place on August 1–7, 2021.

2021 
After a full year of no competition due to the pandemic, Otoguro competed at the 2021 Asian Championships in April 17–18. To make the finals, he dominated 2019 Junior Asian Continental runner–up Nodir Rakhimov to a technical fall and defeated Morteza Ghiasi. In the finals, he was set up to face rival Bajrang Punia, but Punia pulled out of the match due to an elbow injury, resulting in Otoguro claiming his second gold medal from the Asian continental championships.

At the 2020 Summer Olympics, an unseeded Otoguro debuted against former U23 Asian Champion, Tömör-Ochiryn Tulga, and defeated the Mongolian by a 6–3 score; in the quarter-final, Otoguro would then face Ismail Musukaev, who defeated Otoguro at the 2019 World Championships for a bronze medal.  Otoguro would exact revenge, and defeated Musukaev by 4–1, thus advancing Otoguro into the semi-final - against Gadzhimurad Rashidov, another former opponent from 2019.  After a competitive six minutes, Otoguro, again, exacted revenge and defeated the 2019 World Champion, by 3–2, gaining entry to the final - opposite Azerbaijan's Haji Aliyev.  Against another one of his former 2019 World Championship opponents, Otoguro defeated the former Olympic Bronze medalist, and three-time World Champion, Aliyev by 5–4 in the final, to gain his first ever Olympic medal, and took first place on the podium.

Personal life 
Takuto has a brother named Keisuke Otoguro, who is also a world-class wrestler.

Freestyle record

! colspan="7"| Senior freestyle matches
|-
!  Res.
!  Record
!  Opponent
!  Score
!  Date
!  Event
!  Location
|-
! style=background:white colspan=7 |
|-
|Win
|36–3
|align=left| Haji Aliyev
|style="font-size:88%"|5–4
|style="font-size:88%" rowspan=4|August 6–7, 2021
|style="font-size:88%" rowspan=4|2020 Summer Olympics
|style="text-align:left;font-size:88%;" rowspan=4| Tokyo, Japan
|-
|Win
|35–3
|align=left| Gadzhimurad Rashidov
|style="font-size:88%"|3–2
|-
|Win
|34–3
|align=left| Iszmail Muszukajev
|style="font-size:88%"|4–1
|-
|Win
|33–3
|align=left| Tömör-Ochiryn Tulga
|style="font-size:88%"|6–3
|-
! style=background:white colspan=7 | 
|-
|Win
|
|align=left| Bajrang Punia
|style="font-size:88%"|INJ
|style="font-size:88%" rowspan=3|April 17–18, 2021
|style="font-size:88%" rowspan=3|2021 Asian Continental Championships
|style="text-align:left;font-size:88%;" rowspan=3|
 Almaty, Kazakhstan
|-
|Win
|32–3
|align=left| Morteza Ghiasi
|style="font-size:88%"|8–2
|-
|Win
|31–3
|align=left| Nodir Rakhimov
|style="font-size:88%"|TF 13–0
|-
! style=background:white colspan=7 | 
|-
|Win
|30–3
|align=left| Bajrang Punia
|style="font-size:88%"|10–2
|style="font-size:88%" rowspan=4|February 18–23, 2020
|style="font-size:88%" rowspan=4|2020 Asian Continental Championships
|style="text-align:left;font-size:88%;" rowspan=4|
 New Delhi, India
|-
|Win
|29–3
|align=left| Nyamdorj Battulga
|style="font-size:88%"|TF 11–1
|-
|Win
|28–3
|align=left| Daulet Niyazbekov
|style="font-size:88%"|10–3
|-
|Win
|27–3
|align=left| Mohammed Al Jawad Zuhair Kareem
|style="font-size:88%"|TF 10–0
|-
! style=background:white colspan=7 |
|-
|Win
|26–3
|align=left| Rinya Nakamura
|style="font-size:88%"|TF 10–0
|style="font-size:88%" rowspan=4|December 19, 2019
|style="font-size:88%" rowspan=4|2019 Japanese National Championships
|style="text-align:left;font-size:88%;" rowspan=4| Tokyo, Japan
|-
|Win
|25–3
|align=left| Ryoma Anraku
|style="font-size:88%"|8–1
|-
|Win
|24–3
|align=left| Shoya Shimae
|style="font-size:88%"|6–1
|-
|Win
|23–3
|align=left| Yasuki Tsutsumi
|style="font-size:88%"|5–2
|-
! style=background:white colspan=7 |
|-
|Loss
|22–3
|align=left| Iszmail Muszukajev
|style="font-size:88%"|3–5
|style="font-size:88%" rowspan=5|September 19–20, 2019
|style="font-size:88%" rowspan=5|2019 World Championships
|style="text-align:left;font-size:88%;" rowspan=5| Nur-Sultan, Kazakhstan
|-
|Win
|22–2
|align=left| Haji Mohamad Ali
|style="font-size:88%"|6–1
|-
|Win
|21–2
|align=left| Haji Aliyev
|style="font-size:88%"|11–9
|-
|Loss
|20–2
|align=left| Gadzhimurad Rashidov
|style="font-size:88%"|1–8
|-
|Win
|20–1
|align=left| Vazgen Tevanyan
|style="font-size:88%"|6–0
|-
! style=background:white colspan=7 |
|-
|Win
|19–1
|align=left| Rei Higuchi
|style="font-size:88%"|PP
|style="font-size:88%"|July 6, 2019
|style="font-size:88%"|2019 Japan Play-offs
|style="text-align:left;font-size:88%;"|
 Wakō, Saitama
|-
! style=background:white colspan=7 |
|-
|Loss
|18–1
|align=left| Rei Higuchi
|style="font-size:88%"|TF 5–15
|style="font-size:88%" rowspan=3|June 17, 2019
|style="font-size:88%" rowspan=3|2019 All–Japan Invitational Championships
|style="text-align:left;font-size:88%;" rowspan=3| Tokyo, Japan
|-
|Win
|18–0
|align=left| Yujiro Ueno
|style="font-size:88%"|TF 10–0
|-
|Win
|17–0
|align=left| Kouki Shimizu
|style="font-size:88%"|3–0
|-
! style=background:white colspan=7 |
|-
|Win
|16–0
|align=left| Daichi Takatani
|style="font-size:88%"|TF 10–0
|style="font-size:88%" rowspan=4|December 20, 2018
|style="font-size:88%" rowspan=4|2018 Japanese National Championships
|style="text-align:left;font-size:88%;" rowspan=4| Tokyo, Japan
|-
|Win
|15–0
|align=left| Rei Higuchi
|style="font-size:88%"|8–3
|-
|Win
|14–0
|align=left| Rinya Nakamura
|style="font-size:88%"|TF 10–0
|-
|Win
|13–0
|align=left| Hirotaka Abe
|style="font-size:88%"|TF 14–3
|-
! style=background:white colspan=7 |
|-
|Win
|12–0
|align=left| Bajrang Punia
|style="font-size:88%"|16–9
|style="font-size:88%" rowspan=5|October 21–22, 2018
|style="font-size:88%" rowspan=5|2018 World Championships
|style="text-align:left;font-size:88%;" rowspan=5| Budapest, Hungary
|-
|Win
|11–0
|align=left| Akhmed Chakaev
|style="font-size:88%"|15–10
|-
|Win
|10–0
|align=left| Andrei Prepeliţă
|style="font-size:88%"|TF 12–2
|-
|Win
|9–0
|align=left| Vasyl Shuptar
|style="font-size:88%"|TF 11–0
|-
|Win
|8–0
|align=left| George Bucur
|style="font-size:88%"|TF 13–2
|-
! style=background:white colspan=7 |
|-
|Win
|7–0
|align=left| Daichi Takatani
|style="font-size:88%"|TF 11–0
|style="font-size:88%"|July 7, 2018
|style="font-size:88%"|2018 Japan Play-offs
|style="text-align:left;font-size:88%;"|
 Wakō, Saitama
|-
! style=background:white colspan=7 |
|-
|Win
|6–0
|align=left| Rei Higuchi
|style="font-size:88%"|6–0
|style="font-size:88%" rowspan=4|June 15, 2018
|style="font-size:88%" rowspan=4|2018 Meiji Cup
|style="text-align:left;font-size:88%;" rowspan=4| Tokyo, Japan
|-
|Win
|5–0
|align=left| Koki Shimizu
|style="font-size:88%"|TF 10–0
|-
|Win
|4–0
|align=left| Shoya Shimae
|style="font-size:88%"|TF 11–0
|-
|Win
|3–0
|align=left| Ryoma Anraku
|style="font-size:88%"|4–0
|-
! style=background:white colspan=7 |
|-
|Win
|2–0
|align=left| Sharvan Sharvan
|style="font-size:88%"|TF 10–0
|style="font-size:88%" rowspan=2|April 7–8, 2018
|style="font-size:88%" rowspan=2|2018 World Cup
|style="text-align:left;font-size:88%;" rowspan=2| Iowa City, Iowa
|-
|Win
|1–0
|align=left| Logan Stieber
|style="font-size:88%"|10–5
|-

References

External links
 

1998 births
Living people
Japanese male sport wrestlers
World Wrestling Championships medalists
Asian Wrestling Championships medalists
Olympic wrestlers of Japan
Wrestlers at the 2020 Summer Olympics
Medalists at the 2020 Summer Olympics
Olympic gold medalists for Japan
Olympic medalists in wrestling